Ammar Khammash (born 8 October 1960) is a Jordanian architect, designer and artist. His work is based on the integration of building designs with nature and the surrounding environment. His projects helped revive Pella and Jordan Valley by creating two rest stops. 

He has participated in many art exhibits and was tasked to design some of the most prominent buildings in the region. He was given an award for his design of the Nazareth mosque, which was controversial because of its proximity to the Church of the Annunciation. One of his most famous projects is the reconstruction of Pella and the Jordan Valley; he built a rest stop near the museum, one in Pella and the other in Um Qais.

Work
After studying architecture and ethnoarchaeology at the University of Southwestern Louisiana in the United States of America, Ammar Khammash started his career with restoration projects in Jordan. Many of his early projects showed already Khammashs focus on local building traditions and craftsmanship, ecological and social sustainability, innovative design and usage of recycled materials. With the restoration of Dana village and the new guesthouse for the Dana nature reserve he revived an abandoned village and, together with the Royal Society for the Conservation of Nature created one of Jordans first eco tourism sites. Since then many other projects with the RSCN followed, including the Wadi Feynan ecolodge and their landmark 'Wild Jordan' Visitor Center glued to a hillside in central Amman.

Besides architecture Khammash is active in painting, archeology, designing jewelry and photographing the natural and cultural heritage of his native Jordan. In his work he strives to preserve Jordans desert environment and revive the traditional Jordanian building techniques, mixing them with modern materials and design. He was asked to restore and rebuild Hisham's Palestinian Palace, near Jericho which he designed with light paper walls.

Khammash is also a writer, and has become an influential force in demanding that Jordan be both a cultural home for native Jordanians, but also a place that attracts tourists and travelers.

Interest in nature
Besides his work as an architect and painter, Ammar Khammash has a strong interest in the natural history of Jordan and its desert landscapes, geology, flora and paleological past.
His work often centres around nature or integrates natural materials, especially different stone types. In 2016 Khammash created a 'Desert Sound Instrument' as an art project from hand picked flint stones that where arranged in order of their tone when tapped.

Important Projects 

 Dana Biosphere Reserve Visitor Center and Guesthouse, Dana Village and Valley
 Darat al-Funun Art Center, Amman
 Wild Jordan, Main Information Center for Jordans Royal Society for the Conservation of Nature (RSCN)
 The Jordanian Royal Film Commission building, Amman
 Movenpick Resort, Dead Sea
 Bedouin Cultural Center, Southern Jordanian desert
 Jordan River Foundation, Amman
 The White Mosque -- Nazareth
 RSCN Royal Academy for Nature Conservation, Ajloun, Jordan
 Graphic design for the 4th edition of the Jordanian paper currency

Awards and honours
 First Arab architect to win global sustainability award.
 AGA Khan Award For Architecture Shortlist.
 Global Award for Sustainable Architecture in 2019.
 Guardian-Observer "Ethical Travel Award" for the Wild Jordan Nature Center in Amman, 2010

Project gallery

See also
 Rasem Badran
 Ibrahim Salem

References 

Jordanian people of Circassian descent
People from Amman
Palestinians
Jordanian architects
Jordanian contemporary artists
Modernist architects
Living people
Palestinian architects
1960 births